Olaf von Schilling (born 16 September 1943 in Stralsund) is a German former swimmer who competed in the 1968 Summer Olympics and in the 1972 Summer Olympics.

References

1943 births
Living people
German male swimmers
German male freestyle swimmers
Olympic swimmers of West Germany
Swimmers at the 1968 Summer Olympics
Swimmers at the 1972 Summer Olympics
European Aquatics Championships medalists in swimming
People from Stralsund
Sportspeople from Mecklenburg-Western Pomerania